KSEY (1230 AM, "ESPN 1230") is a radio station licensed to serve Seymour, Texas, United States. The station's broadcast license is held by Mark V. Aulabaugh.

KSEY broadcasts a sports talk format to the greater Wichita Falls, Texas, area. The station was the flagship station for the syndicated The Show with John Clay and Greggo hosted by John Clay Wolfe and Greg "Greggo" Williams. That show ended in February 2010 when Williams and Wolfe were unable to come to financial terms.

Established in 1951, the station was assigned the call sign KSEY by the Federal Communications Commission.

References

External links

SEY
ESPN Radio stations
Radio stations established in 1951
Baylor County, Texas
1951 establishments in Texas